Callionima guiarti is a species of moth in the family Sphingidae, which is known from Brazil. It was described by Hubert Robert Debauche in 1934, and is similar to Callionima parce, but is more uniformly brown in colour.

References

Callionima
Moths of South America
Sphingidae of South America
Moths described in 1934